Yakov Kasman (born February 24, 1967) is a Russian American classical pianist, professor of piano, and artist-in-residence at the University of Alabama at Birmingham.

Since his American debut as the silver medalist at the Tenth Van Cliburn International Piano Competition in 1997, Yakov Kasman has performed concerts in the United States, Russia, and Asia, and appeared as a soloist with more than fifty orchestras.

Kasman became an American citizen in 2006.

Career 
Kasman has performed piano concertos and recitals at numerous summer festivals including Brevard, the Peninsula, Las Vegas, Lake Placid, Sewanee and the Grand Teton winter festival. Active as a chamber musician, he has collaborated with the Manhattan, Parissi, Charleston, Shanghai, Tokyo and Talich String Quartets. He regularly gives master classes and serves as competition juror.

Reference Orchestras 
Kasman has appeared as soloist with more than fifty orchestras. The list includes:
the Pacific, Syracuse, Omaha, Oregon, Nashville, Chattanooga, Memphis, Ft. Worth, Alabama, Huntsville and Montgomery Symphonies
the Athens - Greece State Orchestra
the Orchestra de Lille in France
the Orquestra Simfonica de Baleares, Spain
the Singapore Symphony
the National Symphony Orchestra of Taiwan
the Daejeon Philharmonic in Korea
the Moscow Philharmonia Orchestra
the Buffalo Philharmonic Orchestra
the Alabama Symphony Orchestra

Discography 
Kasman has 14 CD recordings with Calliope and Harmonia Mundi.

References

1967 births
Living people
Russian classical pianists
Male classical pianists
University of Alabama at Birmingham faculty
Jewish classical pianists
Prize-winners of the Van Cliburn International Piano Competition
21st-century classical pianists
21st-century Russian male musicians